Fergal McCann (1973 – 8 March 2021) was an Irish Gaelic football coach and trainer. He had tenures with numerous clubs and was an All-Ireland Championship-winning trainer and coach with the Tyrone senior football team.

Career

After finishing his playing career with the Augher St Macartan's club, McCann spent ten seasons as trainer and coach of the Tyrone senior football team. During that period the team won their second and third All-Ireland Championship titles. Working closely alongside manager Mickey Harte, McCann also helped the team to three Ulster Championships. After leaving the Tyrone set-up at the end of the 2014 season, he went on to coach a number of clubs in the county, including Killyclogher St Mary's and Carrickmore St Colmcille's.

Death

McCann had been ill for a number of years and died, aged 47, on 8 March 2021.

Honours

Tyrone
All-Ireland Senior Football Championship: 2005, 2008
Ulster Senior Football Championship: 2007, 2009, 2010

References

1973 births
2021 deaths
Augher St Macartan's Gaelic footballers
Gaelic football coaches
Tyrone county football team